Annihilation of Caste is an undelivered speech written in 1936 by B. R. Ambedkar, an Indian academic turned politician. He wrote Annihilation of Caste for the 1936 meeting of a group of liberal Hindu caste-reformers in Lahore. After reviewing the speech's controversiality, conference organizers revoked Ambedkar's invitation. He then self-published the work. The work is considered a classic and is being re-evaluated time and again.

Background
In a letter dated 12 December 1935, the secretary of the Jat-Pat Todak Mandal (Society for the Break Up of Caste system), an anti-caste Hindu reformist group organisation based in Lahore, invited B. R. Ambedkar to deliver a speech on the caste system in India at their annual conference in 1936. Ambedkar wrote the speech as an essay under the title "Annihilation of Caste" and sent in advance to the organisers in Lahore for printing and distribution. The organisers found some of the content to be objectionable towards the orthodox Hindu religion, so intemperate in the idiom and vocabulary used, and so incendiary in promoting conversion away from Hinduism, that they sought the deletion of large sections of the more controversial content endangering Brahmanical interests. They wrote to Ambedkar seeking the removal of sections which they found, in their words, "unbearable." Ambedkar declared in response that he "would not change a comma" of his text. After much deliberation, the committee of organizers decided to cancel their annual conference in its entirety, because they feared violence by orthodox Hindus at the venue if they held the event after withdrawing the invitation to him. Ambedkar subsequently published 1500 copies of the speech as a book on 15 May 1936 at his own expense as Jat-Pat Todak Mandal failed to fulfill their word.

In the essay, Ambedkar criticised the Hindu religion, its caste system and its religious texts which are male dominant and spreading hatred and suppression of female interests. He argued that inter-caste dining and inter-caste marriage is not sufficient to annihilate the caste system, but that "the real method of breaking up the Caste System was... to destroy the religious notions upon which caste is founded"

Mahatma Gandhi's response
In July 1936, Gandhi wrote articles under the title "A Vindication Of Caste" in his weekly journal (Harijans) in which he made comments on Ambedkar's address. He defended the right of Ambedkar to deliver his speech and condemned the Jat-Pat-Todak Mandal for rejecting the President of its choice because the Mandal already knew Ambedkar was a staunch critic of Hinduism and caste system: 
The readers will recall the fact that Dr. Ambedkar was to have presided last May at the annual conference of the Jat-Pat-Todak Mandal of Lahore. But the conference itself was cancelled because Dr. Ambedkar's address was found by the Reception Committee to be unacceptable. How far a Reception Committee is justified in rejecting a President of its choice because of his address that may be objectionable to it is open to question. The Committee knew Dr. Ambedkar's views on caste and the Hindu scriptures. They knew also that he had in unequivocal terms decided to give up Hinduism. Nothing less than the address that Dr. Ambedkar had prepared was to be expected from him. The committee appears to have deprived the public of an opportunity of listening to the original views of a man, who has carved out for himself a unique position in society. Whatever label he wears in future, Dr. Ambedkar is not the man to allow himself to be forgotten.
Gandhi, however, accused Ambedkar of selecting the wrong interpretations of the Shastras while Ambedkar made his arguments. Gandhi argued that the Shastras selected by Ambedkar cannot be accepted as word of God and cannot be accepted as authentic:
The Vedas, Upanishads, Smritis and Puranas, including the Ramayana and the Mahabharata, are the Hindu Scriptures. Nor is this a finite list. Every age or even generation has added to the list. It follows, therefore, that everything printed or even found handwritten is not scripture. The Smritis, for instance, contain much that can never be accepted as the word of God. Thus many of the texts that Dr. Ambedkar quotes from the Smritis cannot be accepted as authentic. The scriptures, properly so-called, can only be concerned with eternal verities and must appeal to any conscience, i.e. any heart whose eyes of understanding are opened. Nothing can be accepted as the word of God which cannot be tested by reason or be capable of being spiritually experienced. And even when you have an expurgated edition of the scriptures, you will need their interpretation. Who is the best interpreter? Not learned men surely. Learning there must be. But religion does not live by it. It lives in the experiences of its saints and seers, in their lives and sayings. When all the most learned commentators of the scriptures are utterly forgotten, the accumulated experience of the sages and saints will abide and be an inspiration for ages to come.
Gandhi also accused judging the Hinduism by its worst specimen. He argued religion should be judged by the very best specimen that adhered to the religion:
 In his able address, the learned Doctor has overproved his case. Can a religion that was professed by Chaitanya, Jnyandeo, Tukaram, Tiruvalluvar, Ramakrishna Paramahansa, Raja Ram Mohan Roy, Maharshi Devendranath Tagore, Vivekanand, and a host of others who might be easily mentioned, be so utterly devoid of merit as is made out in Dr. Ambedkar's address? A religion has to be judged not by its worst specimens, but by the best it might have produced. For that and that alone can be used as the standard to aspire to, if not to improve upon.
Gandhi also added that the standard set by Ambedkar would fail every known living faith:
In my opinion the profound mistake that Dr. Ambedkar has made in his address is to pick out the texts of doubtful authenticity and value, and the state of degraded Hindus who are no fit specimens of the faith they so woefully misrepresent. Judged by the standard applied by Dr. Ambedkar, every known living faith will probably fail.

Later editions and translations
In the second edition of his book, Ambedkar replied to Gandhi's comments. This edition was published in 1937 as Annihilation of Caste: With a Reply to Mahatma Gandhi. He published a third edition in 1944; it included another essay, Castes in India: Their Mechanism, Genesis and Development, which had been presented at a seminar in New York in 1916.

In 2014, an annotated edition was released by Navayana, a New Delhi-based publishing house, with an introduction by Arundhati Roy titled "The Doctor and the Saint".

Annihilation of Caste was translated into Tamil with the help of Periyar and published in 1937.  Segments were continuously published in the rationalist Tamil magazine Kudi Arasu.

See also 
 B. R. Ambedkar bibliography
 Who Were the Shudras?
 Dalit

References

External links 
 The Annihilation of Caste

Books by B. R. Ambedkar
Dalit history
Books about the caste system in India
1936 non-fiction books
Self-published books